Tajar-e Samen (also Romanized as Ţajar-e Sāmen; also known as Tajar) is a village in Samen Rural District, Samen District, Malayer County, Hamadan Province, Iran. At the 2006 census, its population was 1247, with 276 families.

References 

Populated places in Malayer County